Victor Oliveira (born 28 May 1994) is a Brazilian footballer as a central defender.

Club career
Born in Conceição do Araguaia, Pará, Victor Oliveira graduated with Corinthians' youth setup. In 2013, he joined Atlético Goianiense, after impressing on a trial at the club.

On 22 July 2014 Victor Oliveira made his professional debut, coming on as a second-half substitute for Thiago Feltri in a 4–2 home win against Oeste for the Série B championship. He scored his first goal on 15 August, netting the last in a 2–1 home success against Paraná.

On 23 December 2014 Victor Oliveira signed a three-year deal with Fluminense.

References

External links
Fluminense official profile 
Victor Oliveira at playmakerstats.com (English version of ogol.com.br)

1994 births
Living people
Sportspeople from Pará
Brazilian footballers
Brazilian expatriate footballers
Association football defenders
Campeonato Brasileiro Série B players
Moldovan Super Liga players
Victor Oliveira
Atlético Clube Goianiense players
Fluminense FC players
Joinville Esporte Clube players
FC Sheriff Tiraspol players
Tombense Futebol Clube players
Paysandu Sport Club players
Victor Oliveira
Expatriate footballers in Moldova
Brazilian expatriate sportspeople in Moldova